Kshirgram (also written as Khirogram) is a village in Mongalkote CD block in Katwa subdivision of  Purba Bardhaman district in the Indian state of West Bengal.

Geography

Location

Urbanisation
88.44% of the population of Katwa subdivision live in the rural areas. Only 11.56% of the population live in the urban areas. The map alongside presents some of the notable locations in the subdivision. All places marked in the map are linked in the larger full screen map.

Demographics
As per the 2011 Census of India, Kshirgram had a total population of 2,474 of which 1,260 (51%) were males and 1,214 (49%) were females. Population below 6 years was 242. The total number of literates in Kshirgram was 1,651 (73.97% of the population over 6 years).

Culture
Khirogram is a satipith and is famous for its Yogadya and Shiva temples.

It is said that a piece of the large toe of the right leg of Sati fell at Kshirgram and it is considered one of the fifty one shakti peethas. At Kshirgram the goddess is known as Yogadya. The temple of Kshireswar is a little away from Kshirdighi.

The goddess Yogadya is worshipped at Kshirgram on Vaisakha sankranti and a big fair is organised. It is said that earlier there was no idol of the goddess at Kshirgram but both the puja and the fair were there. The goddess in an ugra-chandi form appeared in a dream to Haridutta, the king of Kshirgram and he got a stone image of the ten-armed Singhabahini goddess made and established it. The goddess is worshipped by the Ugra Kshatriyas in places other than Kshirgram, a day earlier.

When the idol of goddess Yogadya was once found broken, Nabin Bhaskar of Dainhat made an exact duplicate and the cost was borne by the Maharaja of Bardhaman.

Transport

Kshirgram is about 3 miles from the station at Kaichor on the Bardhaman-Katwa line.

Healthcare
There is a primary health centre at Khirogram (with 2 beds).

References

Villages in Purba Bardhaman district